Vezirgeldi Omarovich Ylyasov (born 18 January 1992) is a Turkmen professional footballer who plays for Turkmenistan as midfielder.

Club career 
2018–2019 years he has been played for the FC Ahal.

In February 2020, he signed a contract with the Uzbek club FC Qizilqum Zarafshon. On 1 March 2020, Ylyasov made his debut in the Uzbekistan Super League in a 1–3 loss against Nasaf.
In August 2020 leaves club.

International career

Ylyasov was included in Turkmenistan's squad for the 2019 AFC Asian Cup in the United Arab Emirates. He made his senior debut against Japan on 9 January 2019 at the group stage.

Career statistics

International
Statistics accurate as of match played 17 January 2019

References

External links 
 
 

1992 births
Living people
Turkmenistan footballers
Association football midfielders
Turkmenistan international footballers
FC Ahal players
FC Qizilqum Zarafshon players
2019 AFC Asian Cup players
Expatriate footballers in Uzbekistan
Uzbekistan Super League players
Turkmenistan expatriate footballers